Grevillea diminuta is a species of flowering plant in the family Proteaceae and is endemic to eastern Australia. It is a small, spreading shrub with elliptic to egg-shaped leaves and cylindrical to dome-shaped groups of reddish-brown flowers.

Description

Taxonomy
Grevillea diminuta was first formally described in 1962 by Lawrie Johnson in Contributions from the New South Wales Herbarium from specimens collected by Ruurd Dirk Hoogland near Mount Franklin. The specific epithet (diminuta) means "diminished".

Distribution and habitat
This grevillea grows on rocky slopes in subalpine woodland on the Brindabella and Bimberi Ranges in the Australian Capital Territory and on the border with New South Wales.

References

diminuta
Flora of the Australian Capital Territory
Flora of New South Wales
Proteales of Australia
Plants described in 1962
Taxa named by Lawrence Alexander Sidney Johnson